Robert Landy "Fatty" Lawrence (May 6, 1903 – August, 1976) was a college football player who went on to become the superintendent of Nashville’s Water and Sewerage Services Department from 1932 to 1971; namesake of the Robert L. Lawrence Jr., Filtration Plant. He was the father of United States Navy vice admiral William P. Lawrence and the grandfather of NASA astronaut Wendy Lawrence.

Vanderbilt University
Lawrence was a prominent guard for Dan McGugin's Vanderbilt Commodores football team of Vanderbilt University from 1921 to 1924. He was a part of three conference titles.

1922
In the second week of play of 1922 against Henderson-Brown, Vanderbilt won 33 to 0. Lawrence recovered a fumble in the end zone for Vanderbilt's fourth touchdown. Lawrence also intercepted a pass in the scoreless tie with Michigan. He was mentioned as one of the players of the game in the 14 to 6 victory over Tennessee. The Nashville Banner said Lawrence had been "in there doing a man's job blocking a kick and tackling with the deadliness of a tiger unleashed in a cave of lions."

1924
He was selected All-Southern by his teammates.

References

1903 births
1976 deaths
Vanderbilt Commodores football players
American football guards
Players of American football from Nashville, Tennessee
People from Murfreesboro, Tennessee